Phasmoconus is a subgenus of sea snails, marine gastropod mollusks in the genus Conus, family Conidae, the cone snails and their allies.

In the latest classification of the family Conidae by Puillandre N., Duda T.F., Meyer C., Olivera B.M. & Bouchet P. (2015), Phasmoconus has become a subgenus of Conus as Conus (Phasmoconus) Mörch, 1852 (type species: Conus radiatus Gmelin, 1791 ) represented as Conus Linnaeus, 1758

Distinguishing characteristics
The Tucker & Tenorio 2009 taxonomy distinguishes Phasmoconus from Conus in the following ways:

 Genus Conus sensu stricto Linnaeus, 1758
 Shell characters (living and fossil species)
The basic shell shape is conical to elongated conical, has a deep anal notch on the shoulder, a smooth periostracum and a small operculum. The shoulder of the shell is usually nodulose and the protoconch is usually multispiral. Markings often include the presence of tents except for black or white color variants, with the absence of spiral lines of minute tents and textile bars.
Radular tooth (not known for fossil species)
The radula has an elongated anterior section with serrations and a large exposed terminating cusp, a non-obvious waist, blade is either small or absent and has a short barb, and lacks a basal spur.
Geographical distribution
These species are found in the Indo-Pacific region.
Feeding habits
These species eat other gastropods including cones.

 Subgenus Phasmoconus Mörch, 1852
Shell characters (living and fossil species)
The shell is elongated and subcylindrical in shape with angulate shoulders.  The protoconch is usually multispiral, but rarely paucispiral.  The anal notch is shallow, and an anterior notch is either slight or absent. The periostracum is smooth, and the operculum is small.
Radular tooth (not known for fossil species)
The anterior section of the radular tooth is approximately the same length as the posterior section but in some species one section may be longer than the other.  The blade extends less than one-half the length of the anterior section of the radular tooth. A basal spur is absent, and the barb is short.  The waist is obvious, and there is an elongated terminating cusp. There is a short row of serrations between the barb and accessory process.
Geographical distribution
The species in this genus occur in the Indo-Pacific and Australian regions.
Feeding habits
These species are piscivorous, meaning that these cone snails prey on fish.

Species list
This list of species is based on the information in the World Register of Marine Species (WoRMS) list. Species within the genus Phasmoconus include:

 Phasmoconus alabaster (Reeve, 1849): synonym of  Conus alabaster Reeve, 1849
 Phasmoconus alexandrei Limpalaër & Monnier, 2012: synonym of Conus alexandrei (Limpalaër & Monnier, 2012)
 Phasmoconus andamanensis (E.A. Smith, 1878): synonym of  Conus andamanensis E. A. Smith, 1879
 Phasmoconus angioiorum (Röckel & Moolenbeek, 1992): synonym of  Conus angioiorum Röckel & Moolenbeek, 1992
 Phasmoconus asiaticus (da Motta, 1985): synonym of  Conus asiaticus da Motta, 1985
 Phasmoconus balabacensis (Filmer, 2012) : synonym of Conus (Phasmoconus) balabacensis Filmer, 2012 represented as Conus balabacensis Filmer, 2012
 Phasmoconus cebuensis (Wils, 1990) : synonym of Conus cebuensis Wils, 1990
 Phasmoconus ciderryi (da Motta, 1985) : synonym of Conus (Phasmoconus) ciderryi da Motta, 1985 represented as Conus ciderryi da Motta, 1985
 Phasmoconus cinereus (Hwass in Bruguière, 1792): synonym of  Conus cinereus Hwass in Bruguière, 1792
 Phasmoconus collisus (Reeve, 1849): synonym of  Conus collisus Reeve, 1849
 Phasmoconus dampierensis (Coomans & Filmer, 1985): synonym of  Conus dampierensis Coomans & Filmer, 1985
 Phasmoconus erythraeensis (Reeve, 1843) : synonym of Conus erythraeensis Reeve, 1843
 Phasmoconus gilvus (Reeve, 1849) : synonym of Conus gilvus Reeve, 1849
 Phasmoconus giorossii (Bozzetti, 2005) : synonym of Conus giorossii Bozzetti, 2005
 Phasmoconus goudeyi Monnier & Limpalaër, 2012: synonym of Conus goudeyi (Monnier & Limpalaër, 2012)
 Phasmoconus grangeri (G.B. Sowerby III, 1900): synonym of  Conus grangeri G. B. Sowerby III, 1900
 Phasmoconus habui (Lan, 2002): synonym of  Conus habui Lan, 2002
 Phasmoconus jickelii (Weinkauff, 1873): synonym of  Conus jickelii Weinkauff, 1873
 Phasmoconus kanakinus (Richard, 1983): synonym of  Conus kanakinus Richard, 1983
 Phasmoconus kiicumulus (Azuma, 1982) : synonym of Conus kiicumulus (Azuma, 1982)
 Phasmoconus laterculatus (G. B. Sowerby II, 1870) : synonym of Conus (Phasmoconus) laterculatus G. B. Sowerby II, 1870 represented as Conus laterculatus G. B. Sowerby II, 1870
 Phasmoconus leobrerai (da Motta & Martin, 1982): synonym of  Conus leobrerai da Motta & Martin, 1982
 Phasmoconus lizardensis (Crosse, 1865): synonym of  Conus lizardensis Crosse, 1865
 Phasmoconus marielae (Rehder & Wilson, 1975) : synonym of Conus (Phasmoconus) marielae Rehder & Wilson, 1975 represented as Conus marielae Rehder & Wilson, 1975
 Phasmoconus martinianus (Reeve, 1844) : synonym of Conus (Phasmoconus) martinianus Reeve, 1844 represented as Conus martinianus Reeve, 1844
 Phasmoconus merleti (Mayissian, 1974): synonym of  Conus merleti Mayissian, 1974
 Phasmoconus moluccensis (Küster, 1838) : synonym of Conus (Phasmoconus) moluccensis Küster, 1838 represented as Conus moluccensis Küster, 1838
 Phasmoconus mucronatus (Reeve, 1843): synonym of  Conus mucronatus Reeve, 1843
 Phasmoconus niederhoeferi Monnier, Limpalaër & Lorenz, 2012: synonym of Conus (Phasmoconus) niederhoeferi (Monnier, Limpalaër & Lorenz, 2012) represented as Conus niederhoeferi (Monnier, Limpalaër & Lorenz, 2012)
 Phasmoconus parius (Reeve, 1844): synonym of  Conus parius Reeve, 1844
 Phasmoconus proximus (G. B. Sowerby II, 1860) : synonym of Conus (Phasmoconus) proximus G. B. Sowerby II, 1860 represented as Conus proximus G. B. Sowerby II, 1860
 Phasmoconus radiatus (Gmelin, 1791): synonym of  Conus radiatus Gmelin, 1791
 Phasmoconus rolani (Röckel, 1986): synonym of  Conus rolani Röckel, 1986
 Phasmoconus salzmanni G. Raubaudi-Massilia & Rolan, 1997: synonym of  Conus salzmanni G. Raybaudi-Massilia & Rolán, 1997
 Phasmoconus santinii Monnier & Limpalaër, 2014 : synonym of Conus (Phasmoconus) santinii (Monnier & Limpalaër, 2014) represented as Conus santinii (Monnier & Limpalaër, 2014)
 Phasmoconus sartii (Korn, Niederhöfer & Blöcher, 2002) : synonym of Conus (Phasmoconus) sartii Korn, Niederhöfer & Blöcher, 2002 represented as Conus sartii Korn, Niederhöfer & Blöcher, 2002
 Phasmoconus scalptus (Reeve, 1843): synonym of  Conus scalptus Reeve, 1843
 Phasmoconus sculpturatus (Röckel & da Motta, 1986): synonym of  Conus sculpturatus Röckel & da Motta, 1986
 Phasmoconus sertacinctus (Röckel, 1986): synonym of  Conus sertacinctus Röckel, 1986
 Phasmoconus sogodensis Poppe, Monnier & Tagaro, 2012: synonym of Conus (Phasmoconus) sogodensis (Poppe, Monnier & Tagaro, 2012) represented as Conus sogodensis (Poppe, Monnier & Tagaro, 2012)
 Phasmoconus solomonensis (Delsaerdt, 1992): synonym of  Conus solomonensis Delsaerdt, 1992
 Phasmoconus stramineus (Lamarck, 1810): synonym of  Conus stramineus Lamarck, 1810
 Phasmoconus subulatus (Kiener, 1845): synonym of  Conus subulatus Kiener, 1845 (nomen dubium)
 Phasmoconus sutanorcum (Moolenbeek, Röckel & Bouchet, 2008): synonym of  Conus sutanorcum Moolenbeek, Röckel & Bouchet, 2008
 Phasmoconus vappereaui (Monteiro, 2009): synonym of  Conus vappereaui Monteiro, 2009
 Phasmoconus (Phasmoconus) vegaluzi Monnier, Prugnaud & Limpalaër, 2020: synonym of Phasmoconus vegaluzi Monnier, Prugnaud & Limpalaër, 2020: synonym of Conus vegaluzi (Monnier, Prugnaud, Limpalaër, 2020)
 Phasmoconus yemenensis (Bondarev, 1997): synonym of  Conus yemenensis Bondarev, 1997
 Phasmoconus zandbergeni (Filmer & Moolenbeek, 2010) : synonym of Conus (Phasmoconus) zandbergeni Filmer & Moolenbeek, 2010 represented as Conus zandbergeni Filmer & Moolenbeek, 2010
 Phasmoconus zapatosensis (Röckel, 1987): synonym of  Conus zapatosensis Röckel, 1987
 Phasmoconus zebra (Lamarck, 1810): synonym of  Conus zebra Lamarck, 1810

References

Further reading 
 Kohn A. A. (1992). Chronological Taxonomy of Conus, 1758-1840". Smithsonian Institution Press, Washington and London.
 Monteiro A. (ed.) (2007). The Cone Collector 1: 1-28.
 Berschauer D. (2010). Technology and the Fall of the Mono-Generic Family The Cone Collector 15: pp. 51-54
 Puillandre N., Meyer C.P., Bouchet P., and Olivera B.M. (2011), Genetic divergence and geographical variation in the deep-water Conus orbignyi complex (Mollusca: Conoidea)'', Zoologica Scripta 40(4) 350–363.

External links
 To World Register of Marine Species
  Gastropods.com: Conidae setting forth the genera recognized therein.

Conidae
Gastropod subgenera